Bryt TV is a private, free-to-air television broadcaster in Ghana launched in 2018 by the Joy Daddy Multimedia headed by Dr. Manfred Takyi and Dr. Harrison Tetteh. Bryt TV airs and produces a variety of television programs including Bryt Extra, Daily Extra, Bryt TV Top 10, Out And About, Selfie Jam, Bryt TV Premiere, Yen Sere, and Yendi Dwa respectively. It currently has Ghanaian veteran actor Koo Fori as its managing director.

Programs 

 Bryt Extra
 Daily Extra
 Bryt TV Top 10
 Out And About
 Selfie Jam
 Bryt TV Music Premiere
 Yen Sere
 Yendi Dwa

Events 

 Suhum Odwira Jam  
 Ayeeko Live Band Performance With Dadi's Band 
 Mothers’ Day with Luminary DMR 
 Aboakyire Beach Rave
 Vandal Ubant, 
 Ejisu Sokoo Concert 
 Wob3ti - Akple Za
 Wob3ti Joseph Hill Memorial Concert 
 Eastern Business Trade

See also 

 Media of Ghana

References

External links 

 

Mass media in Accra
Television stations in Ghana